Caleb Poulter (born 12 October 2002) is a former professional Australian rules footballer who played for the Collingwood Football Club in the Australian Football League (AFL).

Early life and state football
Poulter is from the town Ardrossan on the Yorke Peninsula. He played junior football for Ardrossan Kangaroos. Poulter played with Woodville-West Torrens in the South Australian National Football League (SANFL). In 2018, he played 7 matches with the under-16 team, kicking one goal and averaging 15.9 disposals. The following year, he played 13 matches with the under-18 team, kicking 11 goals and averaging 17.2 disposals. Poulter started 2020, by being nominated for the Torrens University Cup Most Valuable Player (MVP) award, following his 34 disposals in the 1st round. In October 2020, Poulter excelled at the AFL Draft Combine. Later that month, he played in the annual South Australian Under 18 All-Stars fixture at Thebarton Oval and was described as the best and most classy player afield.

AFL career
Poulter was drafted by Collingwood with their fourth pick of the 2020 national draft, which was the 30th pick overall. Following a Victorian Football League (VFL) match against Essendon in which he collected 27 disposals, Poulter made his AFL debut against the Gold Coast in the seventh round of the 2021 AFL season, at the MCG. In October 2022, following the trade period, Poulter was delisted by Collingwood.

Statistics
Updated to the end of the 2022 season.

|-
| 2021 ||  || 27
| 11 || 2 || 5 || 107 || 58 || 165 || 55 || 22 || 0.2 || 0.5 || 9.7 || 5.3 || 15.0 || 5.0 || 2.0
|-
| 2022 ||  || 24
| 1 || 0 || 0 || 10 || 3 || 13 || 2 || 4 || 0.0 || 0.0 || 10.0 || 3.0 || 13.0 || 2.0 || 4.0
|- class="sortbottom"
! colspan=3| Career
! 12 !! 2 !! 5 !! 117 !! 61 !! 178 !! 57 !! 26 !! 0.2 !! 0.4 !! 9.8 !! 5.1 !! 14.8 !! 4.8 !! 2.2
|}

References

External links

Living people
2002 births
Collingwood Football Club players
Woodville-West Torrens Football Club players
Australian rules footballers from South Australia